The Yvel is a river in Brittany, France. It flows into the Ninian near to Ploërmel.

References

Rivers of Brittany
Rivers of France
Rivers of Côtes-d'Armor
Rivers of Morbihan